The Slow Show is a British indie pop band, formed in Manchester, UK in 2010. Their music has been described as "minimalist but epic numbers steeped in atmospheric sonic landscapes" with singer Rob Goodwin's "croaky baritone" as a feature that stands out. They have been compared to the likes of Elbow, The National or Tindersticks.

Outside of the UK, they are best known in Germany – where their previous record label Haldern Pop Recordings was based – as well as the Netherlands, Belgium and Switzerland, based on the number of concerts played in each country. Their current record label is PIAS Recordings.

History 
The band was founded in 2010 when keyboardist and producer Fred Kindt helped launch Manchester studio Blueprint, where Elbow and Justin Timberlake have recorded. He met Rob Goodwin, who at the time was playing guitar for another band, "bonding over their love of orchestras, brass bands and film music".

The name of the band has often been linked to a song by the American band The National of the same name. This, however, was supposedly not the inspiration for the name, but rather drummer Chris Hough's "love of show-stopping acts and the band’s determination not to make hurried music".

Discography 

Before releasing their first full-length album, The Slow Show had released two EPs, Midnight Waltz (2011) and Brother (2012). The band released their debut album, titled White Water, in 2015. Their second album, Dream Darling, followed a year later.

On February 6, 2019, they released their latest song, the single "Sharp Scratch".

On October 26, 2021 they released "Blinking", taken from their upcoming fourth album "Still Life" out on February 4, 2022.

Album
White Water (2015)
Dream Darling (2016)
Lust and Learn (2019)
Still Life (2022)

EP
Midnight Waltz (2011)
Brother (2012)

References 

British indie pop groups